Arthur Leslie Lomas (13 February 1895 – 11 February 1924) was a New Zealand cricketer. He played one first-class match for Otago in 1919/20.

While serving in France with the New Zealand Field Artillery during the First World War, Lomas was gassed, which permanently damaged his health and eventually caused his death at the age of 28. An architect, at the time of his death he was working for the Lands and Survey Department in Wellington.

See also
 List of Otago representative cricketers

References

External links
 

1895 births
1924 deaths
New Zealand cricketers
Otago cricketers
Cricketers from Dunedin
New Zealand military personnel killed in World War I
New Zealand Military Forces personnel of World War I